Temple turtle may refer to:

Yellow-headed temple turtle (Heosemys annandalii), a Southeast Asian geoemydid turtle species often kept in Buddhist temples.
Black marsh turtle (Siebenrockiella crassicollis), a Southeast Asian geoemydid turtle species also known as the Siamese temple turtle and kept in Buddhist temples.

Animal common name disambiguation pages